Baltic may refer to:

Peoples and languages
Baltic languages, a subfamily of Indo-European languages, including Lithuanian, Latvian and extinct Old Prussian
Balts (or Baltic peoples), ethnic groups speaking the Baltic languages and/or originating from the Baltic countries
Baltic Germans, historical ethnic German minority in Latvia and Estonia

Baltic Finnic peoples, the Finnic peoples historically inhabiting the area on the northeastern side of the Baltic sea

Places

Northern Europe
 Baltic Sea, in Europe
 Baltic region, an ambiguous term referring to the general area surrounding the Baltic Sea
 Baltic states (also Baltic countries, Baltic nations, Baltics), a geopolitical term, currently referring to Estonia, Latvia and Lithuania
 Baltic Provinces or governorates, former parts of the Swedish Empire and then Russian Empire (in modern Latvia, Estonia)
 Baltic Shield, the exposed Precambrian northwest segment of the East European Craton
 Baltic Plate, an ancient tectonic plate that is now fused onto the Eurasian Plate

North America
Baltic, Connecticut
Baltic, Ohio
Baltic, South Dakota

Ships and related
Baltic (steamship)
Baltic (tug), a German emergency tow vessel
CSS Baltic, an iron and cottonclad sidewheeler ship built in 1860
HMS Baltic (1808), Royal Navy cutter, formerly the Russian Opyt
Baltic Exchange, a UK company that operates as a marketplace for shipbrokers, ship owners and charterers
Baltic Dry Index, a daily shipping index published by the Baltic Exchange
Baltic Fleet, the Russian Navy's presence in the Baltic Sea
Baltic Shipyard in Saint Petersburg, one of the oldest shipyards in Russia

Sport
Baltic Cup (football), an international football tournament held between Estonia, Finland, Latvia and Lithuania
Baltic League, a football club tournament held between the top club sides from Estonia, Latvia and Lithuania, defunct since 2011
Baltic Basketball League, founded in 2004

Other uses
Baltics (poem), a 1974 long poem by Tomas Tranströmer
Baltic Centre for Contemporary Art in Gateshead, UK
Baltic State Opera, the Opera House in Gdańsk, Poland
Baltic Mining Company, a copper mining operation in the Upper Peninsula of Michigan
 Baltic, a locomotive with a 4-6-4 wheel arrangement

See also 
 Baltica (disambiguation)
 Baltiysk, town in Kaliningrad Oblast, Russia
 Baltiysky (disambiguation)
 Bałtyk, a building in Poznań, Poland

Language and nationality disambiguation pages